Ivington is a village in the county of Herefordshire, England, approximately 13 miles (21 km) north of Hereford. It is about 2 miles (3 km) south-west of its post town Leominster. The population as of the 2011 census was included within Leominster.  Ivington has a small church dedicated to St. John, and a Church of England Primary School.

Toponymy
Ivington was recorded as Ivintune in the 1068 Domesday Book, the name deriving from the Old English for "estate associated with a man called Ifa".

Geography
The village lies approximately 13 miles (21 km) north of Hereford and 2 miles (3 km) south-west of its post town, Leominster. Surrounding villages include Ivington Green, Stag Batch, Newtown and Brierley. Ivington lies just south of the River Arrow.

Notable people
Statistician Florence Nightingale David was born in Ivington in 1909. Television presenter and writer Monty Don lives in Ivington.

References

Villages in Herefordshire